The 1928 Chicago Maroons football team was an American football team that represented the University of Chicago during the 1928 college football season.  In their 37th season under head coach Amos Alonzo Stagg, the Maroons compiled a 2–7 record, finished last in the Big Ten Conference, and were outscored by their opponents by a combined total of 177 to 70.

Fritz Crisler was an assistant coach on the team.

Schedule

References

Chicago
Chicago Maroons football seasons
Chicago Maroons football